The W66 thermonuclear warhead was used on the Sprint anti-ballistic missile system, designed to be a short-range interceptor to shoot down incoming ICBM warheads.

The W66 was based on the Arrow warhead design and by December 1966 had undergone six nuclear tests.

See also
 List of nuclear weapons
 Sprint (missile)
 LIM-49A Spartan
 Safeguard Program

References

Nuclear warheads of the United States
Military equipment introduced in the 1970s